Oscar Ling Chai Yew is a Malaysian politician who has served as the Member of Parliament (MP) for Sibu since May 2013. He is a member of the Democratic Action Party (DAP), a component party of the Pakatan Harapan (PH) opposition coalition.

Election results

References

Living people
Malaysian politicians of Chinese descent
Members of the Dewan Rakyat
1977 births
Democratic Action Party (Malaysia) politicians